Marcello Capra (born 1953 in Turin) is an Italian guitarist. His style enables the listener to hear a rhythm although everything is played on guitar (John "Bo Bo" Bollermberg).

Discography

Vinyl

CD

External links
 Official website
 Personal MySpace
 Label
 Interview by Gaetano Menna

Italian guitarists
Italian male guitarists
Living people
1953 births
Musicians from Turin